Tomás Antonio Sánchez de Uribe (Cantabria, 1723–1802, Madrid), was a controversial ecclesiastic and the first editor of several basic texts of Spanish Medieval Literature, including the Cantar del Mio Cid.  He served as Royal Librarian.

1802 deaths
1723 births
Members of the Royal Spanish Academy
18th-century Spanish historians
University of Salamanca alumni